The 2021 Liga 3 West Sulawesi will be the sixth season of Liga 3 West Sulawesi as a qualifying round for the national round of the 2021–22 Liga 3.

OTP37 were the defending champion.

Teams
There are 9 teams participated in the league this season.

Venues
Gelora Djiwa Stadium, Pasangkayu Regency

Group stage

Group A

Group B

Knockout stage

Semifinal

Final

References

Liga 3